Sivabalan, better known as Appukutty, is an Indian actor and comedian, who mainly appears in Tamil films. He became recognized following his performance in Vennila Kabadi Kuzhu. His role as Azhagarsami in Azhagarsamiyin Kudhirai was praised by film critics and fetched him the National Film Award for Best Supporting Actor.

Career
Sivabalan hails from a village Nathan Kinaru in Thoothukudi district, Tamil Nadu. He moved to Chennai in 1994, initially in search of a job for survival only. Sivabalan  was working as a cleaner in hotels, when he was spotted by film personalities and received acting offers from them. He then began acting in small character roles. In an interview in 2011, Sivabalan stated that he always wanted to be a comedian and that he had appeared in several minor roles for over 17 years, before gaining recognition in Suseenthiran's Vennila Kabadi Kuzhu. Suseenthiran went on to cast him in the lead role in his comedy drama film Azhagarsamiyin Kudhirai (2011). For his performance in the film, Appukutty won the National Film Award for Best Supporting Actor, while the film was named the Best Popular Film Providing Wholesome Entertainment of 2011. In 2011 he also appeared in an important role in the film Kullanari Koottam and played a character role in Mohanlal's 300th film Snehaveedu. In 2012, he acted in Mannaru as lead role, next Sundarapandian as supporting cast. He also played with Ajith Kumar in movies such as Veeram (2014) and Vedalam (2015). He also played an important character in Vendhu Thanindhathu Kaadu (2022) directed by Gautham Vasudev Menon.

Filmography

References

External links
 

Living people
1984 births
Indian male film actors
Tamil male actors
Male actors in Tamil cinema
Tamil comedians
Best Supporting Actor National Film Award winners
People from Thoothukudi district
21st-century Indian male actors